The Hong Kong motion picture rating system is a legal system of movie screening and rating. An official government agency issues ratings for any movie that will be shown in Hong Kong cinemas.

History
At the beginning of the film industry in Hong Kong, when the viewing of movies had no age restrictions, films were made under strict guidelines. For instance, movie characters were not allowed to get away with crimes, and sex scenes were not permitted. In 1986, with the release of John Woo's violent gangster movie A Better Tomorrow (later rated IIB), the general public became concerned about the influence films had on children. As a result, the Hong Kong motion picture rating system was established under the Movie Screening Ordinance Cap.392 on 10 November 1988. The purpose behind the law was to provide parents of minors a chance to prevent their children from being exposed to inappropriate materials, as well as to allow people to watch movies with content aimed towards adults.

The ratings were previously issued by the Television and Entertainment Licensing Authority (TELA), and initially provided three levels of ratings, which led the slang term "three-tier ratings" to popular usage.

In 1995, the ratings were amended, creating three levels of main ratings, and two sub-ratings for one level.

The HKSAR government revisioned on 11 June 2021, the Film Censorship Ordinance guidelines for censors. The guidelines stipulate that if the content of a film to be shown violates the Hong Kong national security law, the censor shall conclude that the film is not suitable for exhibition.

Legal requirements
According to the laws of Hong Kong, any movies that are intended to be shown in Hong Kong cinemas or released to the public via any videotape or disc formats must be screened by the Office for Film, Newspaper and Article Administration. The Office will then permit the movie to be released under their assessed level rating. Movie trailers intended to be shown inside the cinema hall or in cinema lobbies must also be submitted for classification. Only still films exhibited for non-commercial purposes (cultural, educational, instructional, promotional or religious) are exempt.

If a movie is rated as a Third Level film, its promotional materials must also be screened by the Office for Film, Newspaper and Article Administration. In addition, any videotape or discs that will be sold must be sealed by plastic bagging before it can be sold.

The Board of Review consists of ten members and nine other persons who are not public officers. Members act as "censors" and review submitted films for classification. Film distributors or any person who disagrees with the censors may request the Board to review that decision.

Under the Film Censorship Ordinance, the Film Censorship Authority may appoint persons to be film censorship advisers as needed, usually for a one-year term. Once every two weeks, panel members are invited to preview films along with the censors and provide their views on film classification. The panel of advisers currently has 300 members, including teachers, social workers, professionals, housewives, and college students.

Ratings system

Of the four levels, Levels I, IIa, and IIb are advisory ratings only, and carry no legal effect. Only Level III forbids a certain portion of the population from watching the film. Ticket sellers in movie theatres have a legal right to check the identity of a person who wishes to watch a Level III film to ensure legal compliance.

Surveys
Every two years, TELA commissions an independent research company to conduct a large-scale survey to collect the public's views on the film classification system and the film classification standards. In 2000, a survey was conducted on 617 members of the public, aged 13 to 59 years old. In addition, supplementary surveys were conducted on 108 members on the panel of advisers and 472 moviegoers. The survey findings were that almost all respondents were aware the classification system was in place, and 59% could identify the current system, as well as its symbols and their meanings.

Findings of a survey conducted from 2010 to 2011 revealed that there is general community support of the existing film classification system and its standards.

Bibliography

See also
 List of Hong Kong Category III films

References

External links

Comparison of Film Ratings between Hong Kong and Other Countries (HK Government) (pdf)
Office for Film, Newspaper and Article Administration Film Search

Cinema of Hong Kong
Motion picture rating systems
1988 establishments in Hong Kong